The R382 is a Regional Route in South Africa. From the N7 at Steinkopf, the route heads west through the Aninaus Pass to reach Port Nolloth on the west coast, where the route ends.

External links
 Routes Travel Info

References

Regional Routes in the Northern Cape